13 Sagittae is a single star in the northern constellation of Sagitta. The designation comes from the star catalogue of John Flamsteed, first published in 1712. It can be viewed with the naked eye, having an apparent visual magnitude of 5.33. It is moving closer to the Sun with a heliocentric radial velocity of −17.56 km/s.

This is an evolved red giant with a stellar classification of M4 III – a star that has used up its core hydrogen and has expanded – and is currently on the asymptotic giant branch. Classified as a semiregular variable and given the variable star designation VZ Sagittae, it varies between apparent magnitudes 5.27 and 5.57. At its estimated distance, this yields a physical size of about 60 times the radius of the Sun.

There is a magnitude 9.96 companion located at an angular separation of 112.6 arcseconds along a position angle of 297°, as of 2013. Designated  HD 351107, this is a class F0 star.

References

M-type giants
Semiregular variable stars
Sagitta (constellation)
Durchmusterung objects
Sagittae, 13
189577
098438
7645
Sagittae, VZ